Christina de Valognes (died 1256), was a Scottish noble. She was the daughter and heiress of William de Valognes, Baron of Panmure and Benvie, and High Chamberlain of Scotland.

She married Sir Peter Maule of Fowlis around 1224, uniting the two Anglo-Norman families, and with him had two sons, Sir William Maule, the successor of the baronies of Panmure and Benvie, and Sir Thomas Maule, captain of Brechin Castle, who was killed in a siege led by Edward I in August 1303, during the First War of Scottish Independence.

References

Scoto-Normans
1256 deaths
Year of birth unknown
13th-century Scottish people
Christina